The 2017–18 Ugandan Premier League is the 51st season of top-flight football in Uganda. The season began on 12 September 2017 and ended on 25 May 2018.

League table

Note: The Saints FC were renamed UPDF FC (UPDF = Uganda Peoples' Defence Forces)

Notes

References

Ugandan Super League seasons
Uganda
Premier League